Ngô is a Vietnamese family name and Ðình is a Vietnamese middle name. Ngô Ðình is often simplified to Ngo Dinh in English-language text.

Notable people with Ngô Ðình
Ngô Đình Diệm, first President of South Vietnam (1955–1963); third of six brothers
Ngô Đình Khả, his father
Pierre Martin Ngô Đình Thục, second brother, Roman Catholic archbishop of Huế
Ngô Đình Nhu, fourth brother, adviser
Ngô Đình Cẩn, fifth brother, unofficial ruler of central Vietnam on Diem's behalf
Ngô Đình Luyện, sixth brother, ambassador to the United Kingdom